Chortolirion (Gk. 'chortos' = 'pasture', 'lirion' ='lily') is a genus of perennial plants in the family Asphodelaceae, subfamily Asphodeloideae, first described as a genus in 1908. It is native to Southern Africa.

Species
 Chortolirion angolense (Baker) A.Berger - Huíla Plateau in Angola
 Chortolirion latifolium Zonn. & G.P.J.Fritz - Free State + Gauteng in South Africa
 Chortolirion subspicatum (Baker) A.Berger - Botswana, Namibia, Eswatini, Lesotho, South Africa
 Chortolirion tenuifolium (Engl.) A.Berger - Zimbabwe, Namibia, northeastern South Africa

References

External links
iSpot, Sanbi Biodiversity for Life, Chortolirion latifolium showing the distinctive leaves
Photo Guide to South African Plants, Chortolirion tenuifolium (Engl.) A.Berger
Zel(e)né Listy - Chortolirion angolense - kytka na pomezí in Czech but with photos in English

Asphodeloideae
Asphodelaceae genera